Mali national under-23 football team, represents Mali in association football at an under-23 age level and is controlled by Malian Football Federation, the governing body for football in Mali.

History

Current players
 The following players were called up for the 2023 Africa U-23 Cup of Nations qualification matches.
 Match dates: 22 and 29 October 2022
 Opposition: Caps and goals correct as of:' 21 October 2022

Fixtures and results
legend

 2019 

Competition records
Summer Olympic Games

Africa U-23 Cup of Nations

All Africa Games*Draws include knockout matches decided by penalty shootout.''

References

23
African national under-23 association football teams